Abu Abd-Allah Muhammad ibn Abd-Allah al-Hakim al-Nishapuri (933 - 1014 CE), also known as Ibn al-Bayyiʿ, was a Persian Sunni scholar and the leading traditionist of his age, frequently referred to as the "Imam of the Muhaddithin" or the "Muhaddith of Khorasan." He is widely renowned for his expertise in Hadith criticism, and regarded as the Sheikh of Hadith masters at his time. Al-Daraqutni, considered Al-Hakim to be superior in the science of Hadith than Ibn Manda.

Biography
Al-Hakim from Nishapur took narrations from 2000 thousand scholars of authority from Khorazan, Transoxiana, Iraq, Persia and other places leading him to have the highest sanad (chains of transmission) in both Iraq and Khorazan. Amongst the leading and renowned hadith masters who Al-Hakim narrated from were his own teachers Ibn Hibban, Al-Khattabi, Al-Daraqutni and Al-Halimi. He had plenty of students who transmitted hadith from him and they include Al-Bayhaqi (foremost pupil), Abu Nu'aym al-Isfahani, Al-Qushayri, Muhammad bin Husayn al-Sulami and others. Al-Hakim is from the second generation of the Ash'ari school of theology, having taken his creed directly from the immediate students of Imam Al-Ash'ari, the most prominent one being Abu Salh Al-Suluki. Al-Hakim studied under a number of Sufi masters that taught him the science of Tasawwuf with the most prominent one being Sheikh Abu Amr Bin Nuja.

Incident
A famous incident happened with the world's most famous Hadith master (Al-Hakim) and the worlds most famous poet named Abu al-Fadl Hamadhani.

It is narrated that a certain poet and a man of letters named, Abu al-Fadl Hamadhani came to Al-Hakim al-Nishapuri. After some time he had a group of followers named a title of praise, Badi al Zaman (Woner of The Age), after which he came infatuated with himself, obsessed and proud. The reason for his praise was that if he heard someone recite 100 verses of poetry, he was able to memorize the poem and began reciting it backwards all the way to the beginning, which amazed the people of Nishapur. Oneday criticized after hearing him say, "So and so, the memorizer of Hadith...." and mention by name? When Imam Al-Hakim heard of this, he sent a book of Hadiths and challenged him to memorize it entirely in a week. But the poet, Abu Hamadhani, returned the book back to Al-Hakim saying, "who can memorize this? Muhammed son of so-and-so, Jafar son of so-and-so reported from so-and-so!? It is filled with all sorts of different names and terms!" Imam Al-Hakim replied to him, "Then you know your limits. And understand that to memorize the likes of this (Hadiths of the God's prophet), is beyond your sphere (of capability)."

Death
On the 3rd of Safar 405 al-Hakim went into the bath, came out after bathing, said, "Ah," and died wearing but a waist-cloth before he had time to put on a shirt. Later, one of al-Hakim's students, Al-Hasan ibn Ash`ath al-Qurashî said: "I saw al-Hâkim in my dream riding a horse in a handsome appearance and saying: 'Salvation.' I asked him: `Al-Hakim! In what?' He replied: 'Writing hadith.'"  His funeral prayer was led by Abu Bakr al-Hiri, Qadi (judge) of Nishapur.

Legacy
Shah Waliullah stated that:

The Shafi'i hadith specialist Ibn al-Salah honours al-Hakim as one of the 'seven compilers of useful compilations' who has the distinction of being one of the few men to have compiled significant works in all three genres of hadith literature.

The Shafi'i historian al-Dhahabi calls him "The great hafiz and Imam (leader) of the traditionists (hadith scholars)".

Abu Hazim relates that Imam Al-Hakim in his time was peerless in the sciences of Hadith. His fame became rapidly widespread from east to west during his lifetime and establishing himself as one of the greatest scholars.

Despite this, he had been accused of being a Shi'a, but al-Subki stoutly denies this. He rejects the label of Shi`i as baseless because Ibn Asakir includes al-Hakim among the Asharis, who consider the Shias as innovators. Others noted to al-Hakim's sincerity in narrating hadith as the first hadith al-Hâkim narrated is:
May Allah make radiant the face of one who heard one of my sayings and then carried it to others. It may be that one carries understanding without being a person of understanding; it may be that one carries understanding to someone who possesses more understanding than he.

Works
Al-Hakim reputedly said: "I drank water from Zamzam Well and asked Allah (God), The Glorified - for excellence in writing books. After this, he began authoring the following books and many others:
 Al-Mustadrak ala al-Sahihayn ("Supplement for What is Missing From al-Bukhârî and Muslim")
 Tarikh Nishapur ("History of Nishapur")
 Al-Abwâb ("The Chapters")
 Al-Amâlî ("The Dictations")
 Amâlî al-`Ashiyyât ("Night Dictations")
 Fadâ'il al-Shâfi`î ("The Immense Merits of al-Shâfi`î")
 Fawâ'id al-Nusakh ("Benefits of the Copies")
 Fawâ'id al-Khurâsâniyyîn ("Benefits of the People of Khurâsân")
 Al-Iklîl fî Dalâ'il al-Nubuwwa ("The Diadem: The Marks of Prophethood")
 Al-`Ilal ("The Defects of Hadîth")
 Mâ Tafarrada bi Ikhrâjihi Kullu Wâhidin min al-Imâmayn ("Reports Found Only in al-Bukhârî or Only in Muslim")
 Al-Madkhal ilâ `Ilm al-Sahîh ("Introduction to the Science of Sound Reports")
 Ma`rifat Anwâ` `Ulûm al-Hadîth ("Knowledge of the Different Types of the Hadîth Sciences")
 Muzakkâ al-Akhbâr ("Verified Reports")
 Al-Sahîhân ("The Two Books of sahîh Hadîths")
 Al-Talkhîs ("The Summary")
 Tarâjim al-Musnad `alâ Shart al-Sahîhayn ("The Reports of Ahmad's Musnad That Match the Criteria of the Two Books of Sahîh")
 Tarâjim al-Shuyûkh ("Biographies of the Shaykhs")
 Târîkh `Ulamâ' Ahl Naysabûr ("History of the Scholars of Naysabûr")

See also
Islamic scholars
Hakim (title)
Mujaddid

References

Source

External links
Al-Hakim al-Naysaburi by G.F. Haddad

Shafi'is
Asharis
Persian Sunni Muslim scholars of Islam
Hadith scholars
People from Nishapur
10th-century Iranian historians
Mujaddid
Muhaddiths from Nishapur
Biographical evaluation scholars
11th-century Iranian historians
10th-century jurists
11th-century jurists
933 births
1014 deaths
Samanid scholars